Loitering is the act of remaining in a particular public place for a prolonged amount of time without any apparent purpose.

While the laws regarding loitering have been challenged and changed over time, loitering is still illegal in various jurisdictions and specific circumstances.

Prohibition and history 

Loitering has historically been treated as an inherent preceding offense to other forms of public crime and disorder, such as prostitution, begging, public drunkenness, dealing in stolen goods, drug dealing, scams, organized crime, robbery, harassment/mobbing, etc.

Loitering provides a lesser offence that can be used by police to confront and deter suspect individuals from lingering in a high-crime area, especially when criminal intent is suspected but not observed.

Local areas vary on the degree to which police are empowered to arrest or disperse loiterers; limitations on their power are sometimes made over concerns regarding racial profiling and unnecessary use of police force. The offence remains highly subjective. In many places, loitering is a crime in and of itself, but in others, serious criminal activity must be observed before police can confront any suspect.

England and Wales 
The Vagrancy Act 1824 was designed to prevent suspects and infamous thieves from lingering about certain places. This was modified slightly by 34 & 35 Vict. c.112, the Prevention of Crimes Act 1871, and 54 & 55 Vict. c.69, the Penal Servitude Act 1891, which introduced the phrase "loitering with intent". The Vagrancy Act 1898 was passed, then both were repealed by the Sexual Offences Act 2003.

The Vagrancy Act 1824 permits in section 6 "any person whatsoever" to apprehend offenders and to bring them directly before a Justice of the Peace. The same section creates a duty on "any Constable or other Peace Officer" to apprehend and bring them before a justice of the peace, or be charged with "Neglect of Duty", punishable in section 11 by a fine of five pounds or three months in jail. The same Act provides disbursements from the general funds of Council for expenses of Prosecutors and Witnesses. Classes of persons that the Act was designed to dissuade, on penalty of three months at hard labor, include:

 unlicensed salesmen
 common prostitutes
 beggars and alms gatherers, or those procuring children to do so
 fortune tellers
 palm readers
 obscenity mongers
 exhibitionists
 fraudulent charity gatherers
 promoters and players of games of chance
 persons with instruments of assault
 persons with instruments of robbery and break-in
 persons found in or upon real property
 and others besides

The law was also used to criminalize men who were found in areas where men picked each other up for sex.

United States 
In several jurisdictions, persons required to register as a sex offender are prohibited from loitering within a defined distance of schools, parks, or other places in which children may congregate.

In 1992, the city of Chicago adopted an anti-loitering law aimed at restricting gang related activity, especially violent crime and drug trafficking. The law, which defined loitering as "remain[ing] in any one place with no apparent purpose", gave police officers a right to disperse such persons. In cases of disobedience, the law provided a punishment by fine, imprisonment, and/or community service. It was ruled unlawful by the Supreme Court of the United States (Chicago v. Morales) as unacceptably vague by not giving citizens clear guidelines on what acceptable conduct was. In 2000, the city adopted a revised version of the ordinance, in an attempt to eliminate the unconstitutional elements. Loitering was then defined as "remaining in any one place under circumstances that would warrant a reasonable person to believe that the purpose or effect of that behavior is to enable a criminal street gang to establish control over identifiable areas, to intimidate others from entering those areas, or to conceal illegal activities."

Australia 
Police officers in South Australia may ask a person to stop loitering in a public place (in other words, to leave the place) where they believe on reasonable grounds:

 that an offence has been, or is about to be, committed by the person or by others in the vicinity (as more usually happens);
 that a breach of the peace has occurred, is occurring, or is about to occur, in the vicinity of the person or group;
 that there is, or is about to be, an obstruction to pedestrians or traffic caused by the presence of the person or of others in the vicinity;
 that the safety of a person in the vicinity is in danger.

Republic of Ireland
In pre-independence Ireland, in 1635, a statute “for the erecting of Houses of Correction and for the punishment of rogues, vagabonds, sturdy beggars and other lewd and idle persons” was passed. Many other laws in the 17th–19th centuries targeted vagrants.

The Offences Against the Person Act 1861 stated, "Any constable or peace officer may take into custody, without a warrant, any person whom he shall find lying or loitering in any highway, yard, or other place during the night, and whom he shall have good cause to suspect of having committed or being about to commit any felony in this Act mentioned, and shall take such person as soon as reasonably may be before a justice of the peace, to be dealt with according to law."

In the Republic of Ireland, the Criminal Justice (Public Order) Act, 1994 allows the Garda Síochána to order to move on any person who "without lawful authority or reasonable excuse, is acting in a manner which consists of loitering in a public place in circumstances, which may include the company of other persons, that give rise to a reasonable apprehension for the safety of persons or the safety of property or for the maintenance of the public peace," and to arrest anyone who does not follow their orders; on conviction, the penalty is a fine of up to €1,000 or up to 6 months' imprisonment.

Sweden 
There is no loitering law in Sweden since it expired in 1981, but the Public Order Act regulates what one can and cannot do in public. The municipality decides what rules apply. For example, it is prohibited to drink alcohol in some designated public places. Loitering can be prohibited under particular circumstances.

New Zealand 
Loitering in public is not illegal in New Zealand, but it is an offence to loiter with the intent to commit an imprisonable offence.

See also 

 Anti-homelessness legislation
 Freedom to roam
 Homelessness
 Vagrant
 Tramp
 Mopery
 Stop and identify statutes
 The Mosquito

References

External links 

 

Crimes
Vagrancy laws